The Jeddah International Book Fair is the second largest book fair in Saudi Arabia, after the Riyadh International Book Fair. The first version of this book fair was held in 2015. From that year on, the book fair is usually held by December in the Events Land, South Obhur, Jeddah. One of the main aims of the fair is to "support the publishing movement in Saudi Arabia", says Prince Mishal bin Majed, the governor of Jeddah. In the sidelines of the fair, a number of galleries are organized. Additionally, many folklore shows are performed by a number of expatriate communities living in Saudi Arabia.

Organizers
The book fair organizers are:

 The Saudi Ministry of Culture and Information 
 Al-Harthy Company for Exhibitions Ltd

Participants
The fair is usually participated by around 500 international publishing houses from more than 40 countries. Moreover, it pays great attention to new and experienced Saudi writers.

References

2015 establishments in Saudi Arabia
Recurring events established in 2015
Book fairs in Saudi Arabia
Annual events in Saudi Arabia
Tourist attractions in Jeddah
Culture in Jeddah